The 1975 Hardy Cup was the 1975 edition of the Canadian intermediate senior ice hockey championship between the Moncton Beavers and the Thompson Hawks.

Final
Best of 5
Moncton 5 Thompson 4
Moncton 6 Thompson 0
Thompson 10 Moncton 1
Moncton 4 Thompson 1
Moncton Beavers beat Thompson Hawks 3–1 on series.

External links
Hockey Canada

Hardy Cup
Hardy